Jeunesses Musicales International (JMI) is the largest youth music non-governmental organisation in the world, created in Brussels, Belgium in 1945, with the mission to "enable young people to develop through music across all boundaries". JMI has established four priority activity fields: Young Musicians, Young Audiences, Youth Empowerment and Youth Orchestras & Ensembles.

With member organisations currently in almost 40 countries, JMI is a "global" network with over 36,000 diverse musical events annually. The events embrace all styles of music, reaching almost 5 million young people up to the age of 30. The work of JMI is supported by the Federal Government of Belgium – Belgian Federal Science Policy Office (BELSPO),  and the Creative Europe Programme of the EU.

Founders

Marcel Cuvelier

Early years and education
Marcel Jules Léon Cuvelier was born in Brussels on May 22, 1899. After having attended classic high school education, he frequented the courses of law school at the Université Libre de Bruxelles and was named Doctor of Law. He was passionate about sports and participated at the Olympic Games of 1920 and 1924 as part of the national fencing team.

Musical studies
His interest in music was firm as he studied the violin from an early age. Furthermore, he took musical studies at the Music Academies of Etterbeek and Anderlecht and the Royal Conservatory of Brussels.

The creation of Jeunesses Musicales
The idea of creating an organisation dedicated to young musicians sprang in Cuvelier's mind early, in 1928, as he was watching the construction of the Centre for Fine Arts, Brussels. "I always thought of giving concerts for young people… I remember that this idea haunted me already in 1928, during the construction of the Palace of Fine Arts, when I was walking over the beams and the bars, when I walked like an insect in that huge frame that would become a concert hall, meeting rooms, offices, halls. I thought about an audience that is demanding, worthy of respect, living: YOUNG. I saw it arrive from all sides, before the spotlight, from those balconies, out of those halls. I could already hear the shouts and the applause" (text from the program brochure "Twenty-fifth Birthday of the foundation of the movement Youth and Music" Brussels January 11–16, 1965, p. 7)

His lifetime dream would take shape in 1940 with the foundation of the organization Youth and Music (also known by the belgicism Jeunesses Musicales). The purpose of this organization was not only to give life concerts for youngsters, as was the case of previous organizations. Jeunesses Musicales was thought of as a real community of youngsters who loved music and were able to organize their concerts and manifestations. 
Meeting René Nicoly brought to the foundation of the Jeunesses Musicales International in 1945. This society, today known as Jeunesses Musicales International, would, later on, acknowledge him as secretary-general.

Career
Marcel Cuvelier had many important functions in his lifetime. In 1927, he founded the Philharmonic Society of Brussels, of which he remained director until his death. 
Of course, he was the founder of Youth and Music France in 1940 and of Jeunesses Musicales International, together with René Nicoly, in 1945. He, later on, became the Secretary-general of the society. 
Other notable distinctions of Marcel Cuvelier were his becoming Director of the International Music Competition Queen Elisabeth of Belgium from its conception in 1953 and his naming as Secretary-general of the International Music Council of Unesco in Paris.

Death
During the thirteenth world conference, in 1958, Marcel Cuvelier was recovering from a heart attack he had had in the spring of the same year. The unfortunate incident happened in Tashkent (URSS) when he was accompanying Queen Elisabeth at the Tsjaikovski Competition. Although doctors advised him to take complete rest, Cuvelier continued to work with ardour and passion. He was found dead on Septembre 1959, in his hotel room in Venice, where he was attending a meeting of the International Music Council.

René Nicoly

Early years
René Eugène Joseph Nicoly was born on September 22, 1907, in Avon, Seine-et-Marne. His origins were humble, as his father was a manservant and his mother, Marguerite, a chambermaid. 
Nevertheless, René Nicoly's path to a musical career started early, as his parents were employed by a famous Parisian music publisher, Jacques Durand. In his house, Durand taught Nicoly to play the clarinet. Although at that time it was unusual for the classes to mix, the two would play together at clarinet and piano. After having served in the military, René Nicoly was offered a place in Jacques Durand's publishing house as head of the orchestral musical department.

Musical concerts and courses
René Nicoly organized concerts and musical courses to introduce all people, never mind their social status, to the beauty of music. His initiative spread to Parisian high-schools and attracted many musicians and speakers: "From the very beginning, René Nicoly's idea had been that of a music awakening – introducing young people from all walks of life, including the least fortunate in society, to music by offering them programmes of a very high artistic standard in order to create a new generation of music-lovers."

René Nicoly meets Marcel Cuvelier
In the autumn of 1941, René Nicoly met Marcel Cuvelier, then the Director of the Brussels Philharmonic Society. This meeting would change both their lives. Then, Nicoly found out that Couvelier was organizing similar musical events dedicated to youngsters in Brussels. After sharing ideas, the two concluded that they should unite their forces to create a movement, which they named "Les Jeunesses Musicales".

Functions
René Nicoly had numerous functions in his life. He was the Managing Director of the Société Française de Diffusion Musicale et Artistique, Vice-chairman of the Comité Nationale de la Musique, head of coordination within the Ministry of Culture of symphonic concerts in the greater Paris region. Also, from 1969 until his death in 1971, he was the Director of the Paris Opera. Nevertheless, he always played an essential role in the affairs of the JMI.

History

1945 – 1960
Marcel Cuvelier and René Nicoly joined forces on July 17, 1945. Their creating Jeunesses Musicales International in the post-war context was a daring movement, but they both had vision and determination. The Palace of Fine Arts in Brussels, where Cuvelier first pondered upon this idea in 1928, would become the headquarters of the society. 
The French composer Claude Delvincourt was the first international president of the society. Marcel Cuvelier was named Secretary-general, a status he would keep until his death, and Nicoly became treasurer in 1945. 
The first General Meeting took place on May 16 and 17, 1946 in Brussels. Then and there, the first statutes of the society were accepted.

Jeunesses Musicales International was a promising initiative from the very beginning, as it already attracted delegates from 7 countries.  
The first country to join was Luxembourg, in 1947. In that year, the second General Assembly gathered observers from another six countries. The following years saw the entry of the Netherlands (1948), Austria, Portugal and Switzerland (1949), Canada (as first non-European country, 1950), West Germany (1951), Spain and Thailand (1952), Cuba, Haiti and Brazil (1953), Great Britain, Italy and Uruguay (1954), Denmark (1958) and Israel (1959).

In the year 1957, it was decided to accept only politically independent countries – independence from the government and the participation of the young in committee were also demanded. Some organizations such as Thailand or Brazil later disappeared.

In 1958 the age limit of the members was decided. Although there was no minimum age, the members could not surpass 30 years. In the same year, projects that aimed at the exchange of young people and artists were drawn up. Also, Sir Robert Mayer proposed the realization of an international youth orchestra.

The fourth Conference took place at Scheveningen in 1949. The International Orchestra played there for the first time under the direction of Igor Markevitch.

Jeunesses Musicales International cooperated with UNESCO from its early years. 1949 marked the co-foundation of the International Music Council (IMC), that grew to become the most important coordinating music organization in the world.

The 1950 Conference marked the decision of one of the most important objectives of Jeunesses Musicales International: the society was meant not only to teach music but rather sensibilize the young towards it. The following year, a permanent judicial commission was formed and in 1952 the international emblem was accepted (the music note on a globe). 1957 saw the organization of the transcontinental tours.

1960 – 1974

The 60s was a period of many social, economic, technological and cultural changes. The JMI was already struck by the death of its founder, Marcel Couvelier, in 1959. The development of music was intertwined with the development of the media, which brought artists to the attention of the public more easily. In those times, the young were fascinated by the propagation of pop and rock music.

A change within the JMI would come along with Paul Willems, named secretary-general of the society in the interval 1960–1974. One of his main concerns was the growth of the organization. In those years Yugoslavia was admitted, followed by East-block countries such as Hungary or Poland and Bulgaria in 1965 and 1966.

In its trying to overcome cultural barriers, the organization also admitted countries such as Japan, South Korea or Morocco.

The 1966 Conference was held in Paris, in the UNESCO building, and tackled the subject of musical education. Then, a world day of Jeunesses Musicales International was declared and the International Music Council took over the idea and turned October 1 into the International Music Day.
 
1969 would become a meaningful year for the visibility of the organization. The initiative came from Yugoslavia and it involved the creation of a summer camp for young students in Grožnjan. After World War II, the population of the Croatian city was drastically decreasing, but the year 1965 marked its renaissance, by painters and sculptors who came to help at its restoration. This Croatian city, with an Italian feel, was dominated by medieval architecture, vineyards and a bohemian atmosphere. Ever since, Grožnjan is known as The City of Artists and holds music courses from June 15 to September 15: With the arrival of the Jeunesses Musicales in Grožnjan, renovation began of the houses rented by the organization, new life came to the town with the bustle of numerous participants, teachers and guests of the Centre, various events and entertainment activities were organized, word about Grožnjan spread far and wide.

Jeunesses Musicales International established the Cuvelier-Nicoly Foundation in 1972. It had the goal to help young musicians or to finance new exciting projects.

The General Assembly, which took place in Stockholm in 1974, helped include "contemporary music" in the objectives of JMI.

1974 – 1990
Although the "golden sixties" were away and the overall economic status hindered the joining of new countries, 1975 celebrated the thirtieth birthday of JMI. Founders Belgium and France organized the general assembly and conference that year. Held in Paris, it had the theme "music animation".
 
1977 marked the breaking of some cultural boundaries, with the conference being organized for the first time in the Far East – in Seoul (South Korea). Two years later, in 1979, the assembly would tackle the subject of pop music.
 
The following years marked the direct involvement in the conference organization of the Americas. Canada held in 1985 a conference dedicated to the "music of both the Americas" and two years later, the meeting would move South, at Cordoba (Argentina).

The eighties saw the rising of the global character of JMI. This was due to the joining of Australia and New Zealand, which counted as the fifth continent in the organization. Also, contacts were made with several countries in Africa (e.g. Egypt).

In 1985, the Jeunesses Musicales World Orchestra made a real trip around the world via Canada, Japan and Korea. Impressive was that in 1987, the World Orchestra performed on both sides of the Berlin Wall Britten's "War Requiem", along with a boy choir from the United States and the Wiener Jeunesses Choir. This was a symbolic moment, which came to emphasize that music has the real ability to break down walls and build significant socio-cultural connections instead.

1990 – 1995
The 1990s were internationally marked by the fall of communism, a strong force in Western Europe. This crucial political evolution would also strike the Jeunesses Musicales. Then, former Yugoslavia split into independent states, which were immediately accepted as members. Because other countries came to join as well, on the eve of the fiftieth anniversary of the organization, a number of 50 member states was reached.

1991 saw the starting of the Ethno project, an initiative of JM Sweden. The project would run every summer in Falun. There, numerous folk singers would gather to share their music and life experiences with the youngsters of the organization.

One of the most important characteristics of the nineties was the pluralism of the genres. This also reflected in the JMI's programs, as the organization had to move with the times.

The logo

The first international emblem of the JMI was determined in the year 1952. For this, the society organized a competition and the winner was Austria. Back then, the logo looked like a musical note on a globe.

The start of the nineties brought along another visual expression of JMI. The new emblem would better represent the dynamics of this worldwide music organization, built by and for youngsters – a red egg with a long, black stem. The sixteen note was being replaced by a more symbolic, bold and younger-looking emblem. "The logo has vitality, the slight inclination suggests constant motion, thus rendering it forward-looking. This dynamic effect corresponds to the rhythm and sound of the association's name: Jeunesses Musicales sounds and familiar at the same time and the pulsating metre of iambic verse and anapest is the motion force behind a forward-looking and artistic grass-roots movement."

Although sceptic at first, all its representatives came to embrace the new and more vivid approach. The new design was meant to represent multiculturalism, as it had elements coming from all corners of the world. It also came to embrace the idea that the power of music can break barriers to unite the souls. In the article "A Plea for a Logo", of the book The First 50 Years, Cristoph Platen emphasizes on this idea of multiculturalism: "The choice of red and black indicates contrast, yet also represents a whole. The design has European, Mediterranean and even Far Eastern elements: the familiar and exotic blend into a colored and figurative New World Symphony, developing into a dialectic tension which carries into the shape, bringing to mind associations such as: Jeunesses Musicales thus stands for music and more; for encounters across political, ethnic, cultural and sexual divides; for a common challenging of frontiers: many voices crying más allá, right through to the United Sounds of JM, produced from the youthful spirit and capacity for enthusiasm about music."

The horizontal version of the logo, consisting of the red egg and black stem, was approved by the General Assembly in Milan, 2016.

International Programmes

EnCore

This program provides young musicians with professional musical opportunities at the highest artistic level. Worldwide musicians meet annually for 2–3 days to enable peer to peer teaching. The program ends with a concert, representing the result of their work.

Ethno 

This unique project was formed in 1990 for traditional/folk musicians aged 15–30. It includes a series of summer music camps held annually in Belgium, Croatia, Cyprus, Denmark, Estonia, Slovenia, Sweden, Norway, France, Portugal, Germany, Bosnia and Herzegovina, India, Australia and Uganda, and additionally some touring projects for smaller ensembles. Each Ethno draws participants from around the globe.

At Ethno, young folk musicians meet to teach each other, by ear, traditional folk songs from their cultures. Through a combination of workshops, jam sessions, seminars, and performances, musicians have the opportunity to learn a variety of musical styles. Bringing together participants from a variety of cultural backgrounds, Ethno is a space for intercultural learning, friendship, and exchange.

Ethno has been recognised as good practice in non-formal education for young people by the 2008 Sunshine Report on Non-Formal Education by the European Youth Forum. The program is managed by the JMI ETHNO Committee.

Euro-Arab Youth Music Center 

Based on the belief that access to music is a fundamental human right and a factor contributing to the sustainable development of young people and our communities, Jeunesses Musicales International (JMI), the Cultural Movement EPILOGI of Limassol and the Arab Academy of Music (League of Arab States) have undertaken a joint venture to establish a Euro-Arab Youth Music Centre, in Limassol, Cyprus.

The EAYMC is the result of a fruitful cooperation between the above-mentioned partners, that started in 2005 with ETHNO Cyprus, a youth music camp bringing together young traditional/folk musicians from the two regions.

The project continued with Ethno Cyprus in 2006 and 2008 (funded by Youth EuroMed and Cyprus Ministry of Education and Culture); Cyprus in Action in 2010 that brought together not only young musicians but also young cultural operators (funded by the European Cultural Foundation) and finally, the Euro-Mediterranean Youth Music Dialogues from 2011 to 2012 (funded by the EU "Culture 2007–2013" Programme).

During the last project, the partners have organised the Euro-Arab Youth Music Forum in Amman, Capacity Building Training Courses in Amman and Barcelona and the Euro-Med Youth Choral Fair: Choral Crossroads 2011 in Limassol with a total of over 500 participants and attendance of over 5000 people, mostly young audiences.

Fair Play

Anti Corruption Youth Voices is a global competition for original songs by young musicians under the age of 35 on the theme of anti-corruption and good governance. The competition is a 2010 initiative of the Global Anti-Corruption Youth Network, a worldwide network of civil society organisations with the specific agenda of fighting corruption.

Fair Play is an awareness-raising program and network building effort to connect socially conscious artists and citizens worldwide, a call for young musicians to join the global anti-corruption youth movement and ensure that the global community hears their messages.

The Project won the 2012 European Youth Award and the World Summit Youth Award for outstanding digital content for social good in the "Create your culture!" Category.

Organised in partnership with the JMI Foundation, the Global Youth Anti-Corruption Network, the World Bank Institute and Transparency International.

Imagine Music Experience

The Imagine Music Experience is an all-styles music competition for young artists. All events have an educational/social dimension including training, workshops and master-classes from industry professionals.

Competitions are held annually on a national scale in Belgium, Croatia, France, Malawi, Norway, Slovenia, Sweden and Zimbabwe and culminate each year with the Imagine Experience and the International Imagine Final.

New entries as of 2015 include Spain, Netherlands, Brazil, Australia and the Czech Republic.
 
Past international winners include: 2013: Were (Zimbabwe), 2012: Gustaf (Sweden), 2011: Algot (Sweden).

Supported by the CULTURE Programme of the EU. The programme is managed by the JMI IMAGINE Committee.

JM Jazz World

The JM Jazz program caters for the promotion of international summer jazz camps, international projects, jazz ensembles tours and international exchanges of jazz musicians between the JMI countries.

Its main objective is to provide young jazz musicians with the possibility to gain experience working to high professional standards in major concert halls, theatres and festivals, and with outstanding jazz musicians, sharing musical ideas in the field of jazz music. Its flagship program is the JM JAZZ World, an international ensemble of selected young jazz musicians.

JMI Global
It is an annual event that brings together our member organisations through a conference and General Assembly, deciding on our collective future.
The event is held each year in a different country, hosted by one of our members.

Music against Child Labour

The program was launched in 2013. The global initiative links the International Labour Organization (ILO) and its International Programme on the Elimination of Child Labour (IPEC) with famous conductors, musicians, musicians' organisations and music education bodies.

The following founders support this initiative: Claudio Abbado; José-Antonio Abreu; Alessio Allegrini, Founder, Musicians for Human Rights; Daniel Barenboim; Pilar Jurado; Benoît Machuel, General Secretary of the International Federation of Musicians; Diego Matheuz; Rodolfo Mederos; Eduardo Mendez, Executive Director of the Simon Bolivar Music Foundation El Sistema; Antonio Mosca, Director of the Suzuki Orchestra, Turin; Guy Ryder, Director-General, ILO; and Blasko Smilevski, General Secretary of Jeunesses Musicales International.

Music Crossroads

This non-profit organisation was initiated in 1995 by Jeunesses Musicales International (JMI), the world's largest youth-music network, organising annual festivals, international band tours, and training many young talents in Malawi, Mozambique, Tanzania, Zambia and Zimbabwe, with established independent Music Crossroads entities.

The project is supported by the Norwegian Foreign Affairs Ministry.

World Meeting Centres
JMI proudly recognises two international art centres – The International Cultural Centre of Jeunesses Musicales Croatia in Grožnjan (Croatia) and the Musikakademie Schloss Weikersheim (Germany).

These cultural centres, established by JM Croatia and JM Germany are open to young people from all over the world. They provide a unique musical environment for development, education, and exchange of ideas and offer various musical and artistic workshops and seminars with lecturers and professors.

World Youth Choir (WYC)

Started in 1989, it is made of up to 100 young singers between the ages of 17 and 26. Managed by the Foundation World Youth Choir (The Hague, the Netherlands), it was founded by three patron organisations: International Federation for Choral Music, Jeunesses Musicales International and the European Choral Association – Europa Cantat.

Yo!Fest Emerging Bands Contest

This is an annual political youth-led festival organised by the European Youth Forum, that successfully mixes political debates and workshops with live music and artistic performances.

Jeunesses Musicales cooperates with the EYF to organise the successful Emerging Bands Contest that is an essential part of the Yo!Fest.

Young Audiences Music (YAM)

This is an international platform for everyone working to bring live music to children and youth.

It is a place for people to connect, to ask questions and to discuss so that together they may build the future of music for young people and the access to high quality live music experiences that entertain and educate.

The program includes YAMsession, an international conference and showcase; the YAMawards, identifying and supporting cutting-edge live musical productions from all over the world that impact young people, both artistically and socially.

YAMspace is an online platform that provides industry professionals with an environment where to share, discuss and access information that will enable them to better their work. YAM makes up over 40% of JMI's activities with 14,000 concerts annually across the world.

BLACKBOARD Music Project
Being one of the most popular activities within YAM, the main aim of the Blackboard Music Project (BbMP) is to increase the quantity as well as the quality of concerts for Young Audiences (YA, primarily school children) in the participating countries as well as improve the possibilities for the exchange of concerts between the European countries/regions.

This is done through creating and strengthening a relevant and well-functioning communication platform and network for YA producers, organisers and experts; through creating awareness of cultural differences as well as universal means in ways of reaching the target audience to promote and facilitate international exchange; through the exchange, education and capacity building of producers, organisers and experts in the field (the producer is a professional who typically has a professional musical background as well as experience from the educational world and as such he/she is able to help the artists shape and develop their production to better reach the target audience).

The program is a partnership of JMI members and young audience producers from Denmark, Belgium, France, North Macedonia, Croatia, Norway and Sweden, co-managed by the JMI Young Audiences Committee and co-funded by the EU CREATIVE EUROPE Program.

National Member Sections

The Board

Presidents

Secretaries-general

Treasurers

Official relations and affiliations
United Nations Economic and Social Council (ECOSOC) (Ros C)
United Nations Educational, Scientific and Cultural Organisation (UNESCO)* (Consultative Status)
International Music Council
European Youth Forum
Culture Action Europe

See also
 Jeunesses Musicales Czech Republic

References

External links
 

Youth organizations established in 1945
International music organizations